LCQ may refer to :
 Lake City Gateway Airport (Florida), US, IATA and FAA codes
Legalise Cannabis Queensland, political party in Queensland, Australia